John D. Cherry is an American politician. He currently serves as a Democratic member for the 27th district in the Michigan Senate. He previously served two terms as a Democratic member for the 49th district of the Michigan House of Representatives.

Before his election to the Michigan House of Representatives, Cherry worked in Michigan Department of Natural Resources Office of Science and Policy and started a small business, Flint Coffee Company, with his wife, which imports from her family in  her native Peru.

References

External links 
 John Cherry at senatedems.com
 John Cherry at ballotpedia.org
 John Cherry at votesmart.org

Living people
University of Michigan alumni
Democratic Party members of the Michigan House of Representatives
Democratic Party Michigan state senators
21st-century American politicians
Year of birth missing (living people)
People from Clio, Michigan